Maitai is an inner suburb of Nelson, New Zealand. It lies at the western edge of Nelson city centre, immediately to the south of The Wood, on the northern bank of the Maitai River. A monument representing the location of the geographic centre of New Zealand is located in Maitai.

The population was 609 in the 2013 census. This was an increase of 9 people since the 2006 Census.

Geography

Maitai covers an area of 0.93 km2, all of which is land.

Maitai has several public reserves, many located within Nelson's town belt, including the Botanical Gardens cricket ground, Branford Park, Maitai Cricket Ground, Maitai Arboretum, Maitai River Esplanade, Sharland Hill Reserve and Sir Stanley Whitehead Park.

Maitai Valley Road, a steep, winding road linking Nelson with Maitai Reservoir and Pelorus Bridge, follows the northern bank of the Maitai River.

Hanby Park, located on the southern side of the river, includes walking and BMX trails. There is also a residential area near the park.

A popular swimming hole, Black Hole, is located at a bend of the Maitai River.

History

The estimated population of Maitai was 1,480 in 1996.

It was recorded as 1,410 in 2001, 1,332 in 2006, 1,314 in 2013, and 1,362 in 2018.

Demography

Maitai had a population of 1,362 at the 2018 New Zealand census, an increase of 48 people (3.7%) since the 2013 census, and an increase of 30 people (2.3%) since the 2006 census. There were 558 households. There were 636 males and 729 females, giving a sex ratio of 0.87 males per female. The median age was 46.4 years (compared with 37.4 years nationally), with 234 people (17.2%) aged under 15 years, 210 (15.4%) aged 15 to 29, 678 (49.8%) aged 30 to 64, and 243 (17.8%) aged 65 or older.

Ethnicities were 90.1% European/Pākehā, 7.3% Māori, 1.1% Pacific peoples, 7.3% Asian, and 2.0% other ethnicities (totals add to more than 100% since people could identify with multiple ethnicities).

The proportion of people born overseas was 33.7%, compared with 27.1% nationally.

Although some people objected to giving their religion, 64.3% had no religion, 24.9% were Christian, 0.4% were Hindu, 2.0% were Buddhist and 2.9% had other religions.

Of those at least 15 years old, 420 (37.2%) people had a bachelor or higher degree, and 96 (8.5%) people had no formal qualifications. The median income was $32,400, compared with $31,800 nationally. The employment status of those at least 15 was that 510 (45.2%) people were employed full-time, 234 (20.7%) were part-time, and 33 (2.9%) were unemployed.

Economy

In 2018, 6.0% of the workforce worked in manufacturing, 7.3% worked in construction, 10.5% worked in hospitality, 2.8% worked in transport, 12.1% worked in education, and 14.1% worked in healthcare.

Transport

In 2018, among those who commuted to work, 52.8% drove a car, 2.0% rode in a car, 14.1% use a bike, and 14.1% walk or run.

References

Suburbs of Nelson, New Zealand
Populated places in the Nelson Region